Fort Hunt is a census-designated place (CDP) in Fairfax County, Virginia, United States. The area is named after Fort Hunt, which was built on the bank of the Potomac River in 1897 to defend Washington, D.C. from naval attack and is now a public park. The area is also notable for its high population of senior citizens and for being one of the first suburbs in wealthy Fairfax County. The population was 16,045 at the 2010 census.

Fort Hunt encompasses the 22308 ZIP code of Alexandria, composed of much of the most affluent section of southeast Fairfax County, close to the George Washington Memorial Parkway and Potomac River, including the neighborhoods of Riverside Gardens, Tauxemont, Herbert Springs, Waynewood, Plymouth Haven, Potomac Valley – River Bend, Collingwood, Stratford Landing, Stratford on the Potomac, Hollin Hall, Wellington, Arcturus and (in ZIP code 22307) Villamay and Marlan Forest. As of the 2010 census, Fort Hunt also includes the neighborhood of Hollindale in ZIP code 22306 and much of Hollin Hills in 22307. Prominent Fort Hunt residents include U.S. Senator Tim Johnson and former House Speaker Bob Livingston.

Geography
Fort Hunt is located in southeastern Fairfax County at  (38.732814, −77.058066). It is bordered to the south and east by the Potomac River, which forms the Maryland state line. Neighboring Virginia CDPs are Belle Haven to the north, Groveton to the northwest, Hybla Valley to the west, and Mount Vernon to the southwest across Little Hunting Creek.

Located within Fort Hunt is Fort Hunt Park, currently operated by the National Park Service, with a history of military activity dating from 1676.

History

The site of present-day Fort Hunt Park was used as an asset for the United States military beginning in the Spanish–American War. The fort had been completed on land that used to belong to the River Farm plantation of George Washington. The fort was used to complement Fort Washington across the river in Maryland, but it was not involved in an actual battle during the Spanish–American War.

During World War II, the fort was used as an interrogation center called P. O. Box 1142 where captive German officers were kept and questioned. Fort Hunt is the site of the death of Lieutenant Commander Werner Henke, the highest-ranking German officer to be shot while in American captivity during World War II.

During the war and after, neighborhoods such as Waynewood and Snowden began arising in the area around the fort, and the commercial center for the community, Hollin Hall shopping center, was constructed on Fort Hunt Road.

Demographics
As of the census of 2000, there were 12,923 people, 4,974 households, and 3,909 families residing in the CDP. The racial makeup of the CDP was 92.83% White, 2.37% African American, 0.17% Native American, 2.56% Asian, 0.05% Pacific Islander, 0.49% from other races, and 1.53% from two or more races. Hispanic or Latino of any race were 2.65% of the population.

There were 4,974 households, out of which 33.0% had children under the age of 18 living with them, 71.2% were married couples living together, 5.6% had a female householder with no husband present, and 21.4% were non-families. 17.9% of all households were made up of individuals, and 9.4% had someone living alone who was 65 years of age or older. The average household size was 2.58 and the average family size was 2.94.

In the CDP, the population was spread out, with 24.8% under the age of 18, 2.8% from 18 to 24, 23.2% from 25 to 44, 30.1% from 45 to 64, and 19.1% who were 65 years of age or older. The median age was 45 years. For every 100 females, there were 94.4 males. For every 100 females age 18 and over, there were 90.6 males.

The median income for a household in the CDP was $102,259, and the median income for a family was $111,935. Males had a median income of $79,828 versus $53,654 for females. The per capita income for the CDP was $46,957. About 1.0% of families and 1.8% of the population were below the poverty line, including 1.6% of those under age 18 and 1.5% of those age 65 or over.

References

External links
 A site with pictures and information about Fort Hunt neighborhoods

Census-designated places in Fairfax County, Virginia
Census-designated places in Virginia
Washington metropolitan area
Virginia populated places on the Potomac River